Verjnuarmu was a heavy metal band from Finland singing in the Savo dialect of the Finnish language.

Performing in a dialect is rare in the Finnish heavy metal scene. Sometimes their style is dubbed as "Savo metal". According to Viitakemies, former guitarist of the band, their greatest influences musically are death metal, traditional heavy metal, and traditional folk music.

Their full-length debut album, Muanpiällinen helevetti, was released in 2006 under Universal Music Finland. In 2008, the band signed to the Finnish metal label Dynamic Arts Records and released their second album, Ruatokansan uamunkoetto.

in August 2018 the band announced the death of their drummer, Musta Savo, and that the band would quit also.

Members 
Puijon Perkele (lead vocals)
Tervapiru (guitar)
Woema (bass)
Musta Savo (drums and death grunts)

Discography

Studio albums
Muanpiällinen helevetti (CD, Universal, 2006)
Ruatokansan uamunkoetto (CD, Dynamic Arts, 2008)
Lohuton (CD, Osasto-A, 2010)
Pimmeyvven ruhtinas (CD, Osasto-A 2012)
1808 (CD, Independent 2015)

Demos
Verjnuarmu (demo, 2002)
Verta, woemoo ja viitakkeita (demo, 2002)
Laalavat jouset (demo, 2004)

Singles
Kurjuuvven valssi (single, 2005)
Itkuvirsj (single, 2006)
Kuvajaenen (digital single, 2010)
Turja (digital single, 2010)
Lentävä kalakukko (digital single, 2012)

External links
  Verjnuarmu - official MySpace
 Official site
 Universal Music Finland
 Verjnuarmu at mikseri.net
 Verjnuarmu @ Dynamic Arts Records

References

Finnish melodic death metal musical groups
Musical groups established in 2002
2002 establishments in Finland